The canton of Pamiers-1 is an administrative division of the Ariège department, southern France. It was created at the French canton reorganisation which came into effect in March 2015. Its seat is in Pamiers.

It consists of the following communes:
 
Artix
Benagues
Bézac
Escosse
Lescousse
Madière
Pamiers (partly)
Rieux-de-Pelleport
Saint-Bauzeil
Saint-Jean-du-Falga
Saint-Martin-d'Oydes
Saint-Michel
Saint-Victor-Rouzaud
Unzent

References

Cantons of Ariège (department)